Village Creek State Park is a  Arkansas state park in Cross and St. Francis counties, Arkansas in the United States. The park was formed as a result of a study commissioned by the Arkansas General Assembly to form a large park in east Arkansas. Segments of the Old Military Road, later used as the Trail of Tears run through the park, which also features two lakes and 27 holes of golf.

History

The Arkansas General Assembly authorized a study in 1967 in the interests of forming a recreational area in eastern Arkansas. In addition to the natural value, the Village Creek area contained the historically significant Old Military Road, later used as the Trail of Tears, and parts of William Strong's mid-1800s plantation. Land acquisition began in 1972, and the park was dedicated on June 27, 1976 in a large ceremony including David Pryor and Charlie Rich.

Recreation

Village Creek State Park offers two lakes for boating and fishing, Lake Austell and Lake Dunn. Fishers will find bass, bream, catfish, and crappie, and boat rentals are available between Memorial Day and Labor Day. There are 10 modern cabins, ranging from one to three bedrooms in addition to 96 campsites (24 premium class A, 5 standard class A, 67 Class B). Campers also have access to five modern bathhouses, a swimming beach, boat dock, and playground.

Picnic tables, grills, and bathhouses are available at Lake Austell Day Use Area, and four pavilions are available for rent. The visitor center includes interpretive displays about the culture, history, and wildlife of Crowley's Ridge and information on the four tribes forced to use the Trail of Tears. An auditorium, grocery store and gift shop are also housed in the visitor's complex. The 27 hole Ridges at Village Creek golf course is accessible from the pro shop. Seven trails, including Big Ben Nature Trail and Austell Hiking Trail are available for hiking or walking, in addition to the Military Road Trail, a part of the congressionally designated Trail of Tears National Historic Trail.

Four other state parks accompany Village Creek State Park atop Crowley's Ridge: Crowley's Ridge State Park, Lake Frierson State Park, Parkin Archeological State Park, and Lake Poinsett State Park are all nearby.

See also

References

1976 establishments in Arkansas
Arkansas Heritage Trails System
Crowley's Ridge
Protected areas established in 1976
Protected areas of Cross County, Arkansas
Protected areas of St. Francis County, Arkansas
State parks of Arkansas